Hunting Season is a 2017 Argentine drama film directed by Natalia Garagiola. It was screened in the International Critics' Week section of the 74th Venice International Film Festival where it won the SIAE Audience Award.

Plot
A teenager with aggressive and violent behavior is forced, after the death of his mother, to spend a few months with his biological father in the forests of Patagonia. His father, whom he has not seen 10 years ago, is a hunter and has another family. In San Martín de los Andes, the place where his father resides, he must confront his own capacity to love and to kill.

Cast
 Germán Palacios as Ernesto
 Lautaro Bettoni as Nahuel
 Boy Olmi as Bautista
 Rita Pauls as Clara
 Pilar Benitez Vivart as Luisina

References

External links
 

2017 films
2017 drama films
Argentine drama films
2010s Spanish-language films
2010s Argentine films